The  Edmonton Eskimos season was the 52nd season for the team in the Canadian Football League and their 61st overall. The Eskimos finished the season in third place with a 9–9 record. They appeared in the West Semi-Final where they lost to the Calgary Stampeders.

Off-season

CFL draft 
The 2009 CFL Draft took place on May 2, 2009. Due to trades, the Eskimos did not have a pick until the second round, when they selected tackle Gordon Hinse, eleventh overall from the University of Alberta.

Notable transactions 

*Later traded to the BC Lions
**Later traded back to the Winnipeg Blue Bombers

Pre-season

Regular season

Standings

Season schedule

Total attendance: 334,479 
Average attendance: 37,164 (62.4%)

Roster

Statistics

Passing

Rushing

Receiving

Awards

Playoffs

Schedule

Bracket

*=Team won in Overtime.

West Semi-Final 
Date and time: Sunday, November 15, 4:30 PM Mountain Standard TimeVenue: McMahon Stadium, Calgary, Alberta

References

Edmonton Elks seasons
Edmonton Eskimos Season, 2009